Allocapnia maria, the two-knobbed snowfly, is a species of small winter stonefly in the family Capniidae.  It is found in North America.

References

Further reading

 
 
 

Plecoptera